Mount Etjo Airport  is an airport serving Mount Etjo Safari Lodge and the Okonjati Game Reserve in Namibia.

See also

List of airports in Namibia
Transport in Namibia

References

External links
 OurAirports - Mount Etjo

 Google Earth

Airports in Namibia